The 2007 Emerald Bowl, one of the 2007–08 NCAA football bowl games, was played on December 27, 2007, at AT&T Park in San Francisco, California, with the  Atlantic Coast Conference represented by the Maryland Terrapins against the Oregon State Beavers, representing the Pacific-10 Conference.

The Terrapins scored all of their 14 points in the first quarter, while the Beavers scored successive touchdowns in the first, second and third quarters to win the game 21–14. Running back Yvenson Bernard and linebacker Derrick Doggett were the game MVPs.

References

External links
 Game summary at ESPN
 Box score via newspapers.com

Emerald Bowl
Redbox Bowl
Maryland Terrapins football bowl games
Oregon State Beavers football bowl games
Emerald Bowl
Emerald Bowl